Toko is a rural outback locality in the Shire of Boulia, Queensland, Australia.

Geography 
Toko is in the Channel Country. All watercourses in this area are part of the Lake Eyre drainage basin, and most will dry up before their water reaches Lake Eyre.

The predominant land use is grazing on native vegetation.

History

Education 
There are no schools in Toko. The nearest primary school is in Boulia. The nearest secondary schools are in Mount Isa and Winton, both too far for a daily commute. The Spinifex State College in Mount Isa offers boarding facilities. Other boarding schools and distance education are options.

References 

Shire of Boulia
Localities in Queensland